The Copa Peugeot Argentina de Tenis (sponsored by Peugeot) was a professional tennis exhibition.  Which follows round robin format, split into two groups, before a final between the group winners. It was played on hard courts. It used to be held annually in December at the Buenos Aires Lawn Tennis Club in Buenos Aires, Argentina, since 2003 to 2012.

Past finals

References

External links
Official website

Tennis tournaments in Argentina
Sports competitions in Buenos Aires
Exhibition tennis tournaments
Hard court tennis tournaments